Prince Carlos of Bourbon-Parma, Duke of Parma and Piacenza (born 27 January 1970) is the current head of the House of Bourbon-Parma, as well a member of the Dutch Royal Family. He is the claimant to the defunct throne of the extinct Duchy of Parma. In addition, he is considered by some a contested pretender to the Carlist claim to the throne of Spain under the name Carlos Javier I (English: Charles Xavier I). In 2016 Carlos told the Spanish press that, while (like his father in 2005) he "does not abandon" his claim to the throne, it is "not a priority" in his life, and he "will not dispute" [no planteo pleito] the legitimacy of King Felipe VI. Since 15 May 1996 he has been part of the enlarged Dutch royal family with the title – conferred on him by the Queen of the Netherlands – of "Prince de Bourbon de Parme" in the Dutch nobility.

Early life

Carlos was born in Nijmegen in the Netherlands as the eldest child of Carlos Hugo, Duke of Parma, and Princess Irene of the Netherlands. He has two younger sisters, Princess Margarita and Princess Carolina, and a younger brother, Prince Jaime. He was baptized in the Catholic faith on 10 February 1970 by Archbishop Marcel Lefebvre. Carlos spent his youth in several countries including the Netherlands, Spain, France, England, and the United States. In 1981, when he was eleven, his parents divorced. Together with his mother and his siblings he then moved to Soestdijk Palace (Baarn) in the Netherlands. He lived at the palace for a number of years with his grandparents, Queen Juliana of the Netherlands and Prince Bernhard of the Netherlands.

Education and career
Carlos studied political science at Wesleyan University in Connecticut and demography and philosophy at Cambridge University in England.

After completing his studies Carlos worked for the company ABN AMRO in Amsterdam, where he was involved with preparations for the introduction of the euro. He then worked for a period in Brussels as a public affairs consultant for the company European Public Policy Advisors (EPPA). Since 2007 he has been engaged in projects concerning sustainability in the business world.

Dutch royal house
Carlos is sometimes present at representative occasions concerning the royal house of the Netherlands. In 2003 he was involved, together with his aunt, Queen Beatrix, in the inauguration of the "Prince Claus Leerstoel", a professorship named after the Queen's husband, Prince Claus. During special events of the royal house he is regularly present. For example, he was one of the organizers of the wedding celebration of Prince Constantijn and Princess Laurentien.

Personal life

Relationship with Brigitte Klynstra and son
Prince Carlos had a relationship with Brigitte Klynstra (born 10 January 1959), the stepdaughter of Count Adolph Roderik van Rechteren Limpurg. During this relationship he fathered a son:

 Carlos Hugo Roderik Sybren Klynstra (born 20 January 1997 in Nijmegen).

In December 2015, the then 18-year-old Carlos Klynstra started the legal procedure to attempt to change his surname to that of his biological father which would also allow him to use the title of "Prince". The Duke of Parma opposed this on the basis that it was in contravention of the traditions of the House of Bourbon-Parma. On 9 March 2016 the Minister of Security and Justice declared his family name request valid. Later that year a court in The Hague concurred with the minister in declaring the claim valid under Dutch law.

According to the judgement, Carlos Hugo will be entitled to be known as "Zijne Koninklijke Hoogheid Carlos Hugo Roderik Sybren prins de Bourbon de Parme" (His Royal Highness Prince Carlos Hugo Roderik Sybren of Bourbon-Parma); this will come only into effect once the Dutch king has signed the royal decree. According to the press release of the Council of State of 28 February 2018, the name change does not mean that Klynstra is now also a member of the Royal House of  Bourbon-Parma. That is a private matter of the House itself and this is outside the jurisdiction of the Dutch Nobility Law.

Marriage to Annemarie Gualthérie van Weezel
On 7 October 2009 it was announced through his mother's private secretary that Prince Carlos would marry Annemarie Cecilia Gualthérie van Weezel. The civil marriage took place on 12 June 2010 at Wijk bij Duurstede. The church wedding was to have taken place at the La Cambre Abbey in Ixelles on 28 August, but it was postponed owing to his father's illness. Prince Carlos Hugo died shortly afterwards.

Annemarie (born The Hague, 18 December 1977) is the daughter of Johan (Hans) Stephan Leonard Gualthérie van Weezel and 
Gerarda Gezine Jolande (Ank) de Visser. Her father was a member of the House of Representatives of the Netherlands for the Christian Democratic party, the Dutch ambassador to the Council of Europe in Strasbourg, and the ambassador to Luxembourg. Gualthérie van Weezel's paternal grandfather was Jan Hans Gualthérie van Weezel, who was the head of the police in The Hague and member of the Dutch resistance during the Second World War. Annemarie Gualthérie van Weezel went to secondary school in Strasbourg and obtained a Master of Laws degree at the University of Utrecht. Subsequently, she completed a post-graduate study in Radio and Television journalism at the University of Groningen. Gualthérie van Weezel works as a parliamentary journalist in The Hague and Brussels for the Dutch public channel NOS. In Brussels, she met Prince Carlos for the first time.

On 2 August 2010, it was revealed that the health of his father, the Duke of Parma, was quickly deteriorating due to cancer. As a consequence, the church wedding of the prince Carlos and his fiancée was delayed. In a final announcement about his condition, the Duke confirmed Carlos as the next Head of the House of Bourbon-Parma. Just before his death the old Duke of Parma named Annemarie as "Contessa di Molina" (Countess of Molina). Prince Carlos's father died on 18 August 2010 in Barcelona, Spain, at the age of 80; Carlos subsequently became the next head of the House of Bourbon-Parma.

The new Duke of Parma and Annemarie were married on 20 November 2010 in La Cambre Abbey.
Together they have two daughters and a son:

 Her Royal Highness Princess Luisa Irene Constance Anna Maria of Bourbon-Parma, Marquise of Castell'Arquato (born on 9 May 2012 in The Hague);
 Her Royal Highness Princess Cecilia Maria Johanna Beatrix of Bourbon-Parma, Countess of Berceto (born 17 October 2013 in The Hague);
 His Royal Highness Prince Carlos Enrique Leonard of Bourbon-Parma, Prince of Piacenza (born 24 April 2016 in The Hague).

In 2016 at the baptism of Prince Carlos Enrique, Prince Carlo conferred on his son the title of "Principe di Piacenza" (Prince of Piacenza), which is the traditional title assigned to a crown prince of the House of Bourbon Parma, the continuer of the dynasty, and future Duke of Parma and Piacenza. In September 2017, the Duke of Parma named his daughter Luisa as "Marchesa di Castell'Arquato" (Marquise of Castell'Arquato), and her younger sister Cecilia was named as "Contessa di Berceto" (Countess of Berceto).

His rights as the Carlist pretender
Carlos Xavier, in an interview with the newspaper La Vanguardia, said:

Titles, styles and honours

Titles and styles
2 September 1996 – 18 August 2010: His Royal Highness The Prince of Piacenza
18 August 2010 – present: His Royal Highness The Duke of Parma and Piacenza
Officially in the Netherlands: 15 May 1996 – present: His Royal Highness Prince Carlos de Bourbon de Parme

Honours

National
 
Recipient of the King Willem-Alexander Investiture Medal
Recipient of the Wedding Medal 2002 (The Prince of Orange and Miss Máxima Zorreguieta)

International
 : Grand Cross Order of San Marino
 : Knight of Honour and Devotion of the Sovereign Military Order of Malta

Dynastic 
As Head of the House of Bourbon-Parma, Carlos is Grand Master of four dynastic orders:
 Grand Master of the Parmese Sacred Military Constantinian Order of Saint George (Sacro Angelico Imperiale Ordine Costantiniano di San Giorgio)
 Grand Master of the Order of Saint Louis for Civil Merit (Real Ordine del Merito sotto il titolo di San Lodovico)
 Grand Master of the Order of St. George for Military Merit (Ordine al merito militare di San Giorgio di Lucca)
 Grand Master of the Order of the Legitimidad Proscrita (Ordine de la Legitimidad Proscrita)

Ancestry

Notes

References

External links

Official website of the House of Bourbon-Parma

|-

1970 births
Living people
People from Nijmegen
Princes of Bourbon-Parma
Dutch princes
Italian nobility
Dukes of Parma
Dukes of Spain
Wesleyan University alumni
Pretenders to the throne of Parma
Carlist pretenders to the Spanish throne
House of Bourbon-Parma
Alumni of the University of Cambridge
Navarrese titular monarchs